Baki Süha Ediboğlu (1915 – September 15, 1972) was a Turkish poet and author.

Biography
Ediboğlu was born in Antalya in 1915. He graduated from Istanbul Hayriye High School in 1936. He didn’t complete his education at Istanbul University, Faculty of Law or Ankara University, Faculty of Language, History and Geography. He began to work as a journalist and wrote for the newspapers Tan, Akşam, Cumhuriyet (1934–40), then he worked at Ankara Radio and at the General Directorate of Press and Broadcasting. After, he worked as the Chief Broadcaster for Istanbul Radio and as the Director of İzmir Radio (1950–56). He worked as an assistant director at Istanbul Radio (1966) and finally as a consultant.

His poems, stories and articles on various subjects were published in magazines and newspapers such as Servet-i Fünûn (1929), Ülkü, Aile(1942–48), Varlık (1934–70), and Cumhuriyet. He read selected poems for radio programs. He also wrote plays and stories for radio.

Bibliography
Poetry
 "Cenup" (The South, 1942)
 "Gece Yağmuru" (Night Rain, 1947)
 "İşaret" (Sign, 1953)
 "Karanlıkta Geçen Gemiler" (Ships Sailing in the Darkness, 1958)

Short stories
 "Sel Geliyor" (A Flood is Coming, 1944)

Anthologies
 "Türk Şiirinden Örnekler" (Examples from Turkish Poetry, 1944)
 "Atatürk İçin Bütün Şiirler" (All Poems Written for Atatürk, anthology, in collaboration with Faruk Çağlayan, 1962)

Biographies
 "Fatih Rıfkı Atay Konuşuyor" (Fatih Rıfkı Atay is Speaking, 1946)
 "Ünlü Türk Bestekarları" (Famous Turkish Composers, 1962)

Memoirs
 "Bizim Kuşak ve Ötekileri" (Our Generation and Beyond, memoirs of 36 poets, 1968)

See also
 List of contemporary Turkish poets

References
 Kenthaber.com - Biography of Baki Süha Ediboğlu 
 Aruz.com - Anthology of Turkish poetry: Biography and poetry of Baki Süha Ediboğlu

External links
 Baki Süha Ediboğlu - On his poetry

Turkish poets
1915 births
1972 deaths
Composers of Ottoman classical music
Composers of Turkish makam music
20th-century poets
Istanbul University Faculty of Law alumni